KRNM (88.1 FM), is a National Public Radio-affiliated non-commercial educational radio station run by Marianas Educational Media Services, Inc., in Saipan, Northern Mariana Islands. It primarily features National Public Radio programming.

The station was assigned the KRNM call letters by the Federal Communications Commission (FCC) on February 19, 1996.

This station was previously owned and operated by the Northern Marianas College (NMC).  The FCC granted NMC a license to broadcast non-commercial public radio programming on KRNM, 88.1 FM on February 2, 1998.

Former translators
At some point in the past, KRNM also operated a translator on 89.1 FM, K206BM.  This was switched to relaying Guam's KPRG at an unknown date.

References

External links
 
 

NPR member stations
RNM
1996 in the Northern Mariana Islands
1990s establishments in the Northern Mariana Islands
Saipan
Radio stations established in 1996
Public broadcasting in insular areas of the United States